Yakaré Niakaté (born 12 January 1997) is a French-born Malian footballer who plays as a defender for US Orléans and the Mali women's national team.

Club career
Niakaté is a ASJ Soyaux product. She has played for Stade Brestois 29, US Saint-Malo and Orléans in France.

International career
Niakaté competed for Mali at the 2018 Africa Women Cup of Nations, playing in three matches.

References

1997 births
Living people
Citizens of Mali through descent
Malian women's footballers
Women's association football defenders
Mali women's international footballers
People from Vernon, Eure
Sportspeople from Eure
French women's footballers
US Orléans players
Black French sportspeople
French sportspeople of Malian descent
Footballers from Normandy